The Kenworth 10-ton 6x6 heavy wrecking truck (G116) (officially Heavy Wrecking Truck M1) was the standard heavy wrecker of the US Army during World War II. It was replaced in the 1950s by 5-ton wreckers.

History
In 1939-1941 the Army Ordnance Corps was developing a complete line of tactical trucks that could operate over all roads and cross-country terrain in all weather. Corbitt, a small company which had sold the US Army trucks since 1917, was working on designs for heavy-duty conventional 6x6s trucks. In 1940 their designs for a 6-ton truck and a 10-ton wrecker chassis were standardized, with Corbitt to build 6-ton cargo trucks, while the 10-ton wreckers were contracted to Kenworth Motor Truck Corp. and Ward LaFrance Truck Corp. Ward LaFrance began production in 1941 and would build 4,925 vehicles. Kenworth began in 1942, but because of interruptions in manufacturing only built 840. At first the manufacturers' chassis were similar and used the same components. After the 1943 upgrade to -A1 standard, the two chassis were mechanically identical and parts were interchangeable. After the war, the rating of the 10-ton wrecker was lowered to 6-ton.

Engine and driveline

A Continental 22-R engine was used by all trucks.

The 5-speed manual Fuller transmission had a very low 1st gear, was direct in 4th and had an overdrive 5th. A separate 2-speed transfer case also engaged or disengaged the front axle.

Chassis
The M1 had a ladder frame with three live beam axles, the front on leaf springs, the rear tandem on leaf springs with locating arms. All models had a  wheelbase. Brakes were full air, the tires were 11.00x20 with dual rear tires.

In addition to the wrecking body, all trucks had a  front winch and a rear pintle hitch. The -A1 upgrade also had a rear winch, heavier bumpers, and a large front tow-bar, allowing the truck to recover and move light armored vehicles.

Bodies

Early models used the manufacturer's commercial cab, fenders, and specific hoods, making the two models look different. The -A1 models had open military cabs, flat fenders, and similar hoods, making all look the same.

All bodies used by both manufacturers were built by Garwood. A single boom could be raised and lowered by cable, rotate 180°, and carried a cable from a  winch. Outriggers and braces on both the body and the boom itself allowed  to be lifted throughout the rear 180° of the truck. In early models, all actions except for the winches were manual; later models had powered booms. The -A1 upgrade had a different boom and the front sides of the body were cut away from the mast and spare tires.

Gallery

Notes

References

External links
M1/M1A1 at Olive-Drab.com
Ward LaFrance Corp. at usautoindustryworldwartwo.com

Military trucks of the United States
World War II vehicles of the United States
Military vehicles introduced from 1940 to 1944